= Maame Biamah Akwafo =

Ghanaian media advocate

- Born: Ghana
- Other name: Linda Biamah Akwafo
- Occupations: Media Professional, Broadcasting Executive
- Years active: 2025–present
- Known for: Inaugural President of the Network of Women in Broadcasting (NOWIB)
- Title: President, Network of Women in Broadcasting (NOWIB)
- Term: 2025–2028
- Predecessor: Position established
- Board member of: Network of Women in Broadcasting Executive Council

Maame Biamah Akwafo (also identified as Linda Biamah Akwafo) is a Ghanaian media professional and broadcasting executive who serves as the President of the Network of Women in Broadcasting (NOWIB), a professional association that is dedicated to the advancement of the role women in Ghana's media industry.

== Career ==
In January 2025, the Network of Women in Broadcasting (NOWIB) announced its Executive Council, which will serve a three-year term from 2025 to 2028. Maame Biamah Akwafo was elected to be the founding President of this organization, which comprises approximately eighty (80) professionals from diverse platforms across Ghana.

Upon her election, Biamah effectively explained the council's mission, stating, "We are excited to establish our Executive Council, which will help us achieve our goal of creating a supportive ecosystem for the women in broadcasting. We aim to foster a culture of collaboration, growth and mentorship, ultimately paving the way for future generations of women in media". NOWIB operates under the patronage of veteran broadcasters like Nana Yaa Konadu and Nana Yaa Brefo, bringing together experienced media professionals committed to supporting and empowering women in the industry.
